Khalid Naciri ( – born 5 March 1946, Casablanca) is a Moroccan politician of the Party of Progress and Socialism. Between 2007 and 2012, he held the position of Minister of Communications and Spokesperson of the Government in the cabinet of Abbas El Fassi.

Khalid Naciri was born in Casablanca and studied in the Mission laïque française (Lycée Lyautey); in 1970 he graduated with a bachelor in law from the "Casablanca faculty of law" and the University of Mohammad V of Rabat. He then worked as a lawyer and was an active member of Morocco's communist party.

See also
Cabinet of Morocco

References

Moroccan politicians
Living people
Ministers of Communications of Morocco
1946 births
People from Casablanca
20th-century Moroccan lawyers
Paris 2 Panthéon-Assas University alumni
Mohammed V University alumni
Party of Progress and Socialism politicians